Independent Turnverein, also known as the Hoosier Athletic Club and Marott Building, is a historic clubhouse located at Indianapolis, Indiana.  It was built in 1913–1914, and consists of a main three-story brick pavilion connected by a two-story section to a second three-story brick pavilion. It has Prairie School and American Craftsman design elements, including a red tile hipped roof.  It features paneled and decorated pilasters, a second floor Palladian window, and limestone decorative elements. The building was remodeled in 1946.

It was listed on the National Register of Historic Places in 1983.

References

External links

Clubhouses on the National Register of Historic Places in Indiana
Buildings and structures completed in 1914
Buildings and structures in Indianapolis
National Register of Historic Places in Indianapolis
Prairie School architecture in Indiana
American Craftsman architecture in Indiana